"Here Comes the Judge" is a 1968 song written by Shorty Long, Billie Jean Brown and Suzanne de Passe, and performed by Long. The song was Long's biggest hit, reaching No. 4 on the U.S. R&B chart and No. 8 on the Billboard Hot 100. It held the No. 10 spot on Cashbox for two weeks. The song stayed on the Hot 100 for 11 weeks and Cashbox for 9 weeks.  The song also entered the UK chart in July 1968, and was a Top 30 hit, peaking at #30.

"Here Comes the Judge" was inspired by a comic act on Rowan & Martin's Laugh-In about a judge by Pigmeat Markham, whose own "Here Comes the Judge" - a completely different song - charted two weeks after Long's did in June 1968, and became a Top 20 hit.

Charts

References

1968 songs
1968 singles
Motown singles
Shorty Long songs
Songs written by Shorty Long